Aarne Aatami "Arvo" Peussa (25 December 1900 – 19 July 1941) was a Finnish middle-distance runner. He competed in the men's 1500 metres at the 1924 Summer Olympics where he won his heat to come 9th in the final. He was killed in action at age 40 in Russia during World War II.

References

External links
 

1900 births
1941 deaths
Athletes (track and field) at the 1924 Summer Olympics
Finnish male middle-distance runners
Olympic athletes of Finland
People from Primorsk, Leningrad Oblast
Finnish military personnel killed in World War II